Ghaleb Mutahar al-Qamesh (born 1948) is a Yemeni politician, military and intelligence official. He served as chief of Political Security Office, Yemen's intelligence agency, for more than three decades.

Early life and education 
Ghaleb was born in Kharif District, Amran Governorate, in 1948. He studied his basic education and grew up in his village al-Assyah in Kharif of Amran northern Yemen. He joined the Military Academy in Sana'a and graduated in 1968.

Career 

 Chief of Yemen's Political Security Office (1980–2014)
 Minister of Interior (1990–1993)
 Ambassador in the Ministry of Foreign Affairs (2014– )

References 

1948 births
Interior ministers of Yemen
People from Amran Governorate
20th-century Yemeni military personnel
21st-century Yemeni military personnel
Yemeni Military Academy alumni
Attas Cabinet